Immingham Town F.C. is an English football club based in Immingham, Lincolnshire. The senior team plays in the Lincolnshire League and is managed by Tom Summers with H Taylor as his assistant and Shane Jacklin & Martin Burke as Coach. The Reserve Squad is run by Simon Pinchbeck & Sam Vincent.

History
Immingham Town FC reformed in 2016, 21 years after the old club was dissolved. The previous team had been in existence since 1912 until its dissolution in 1995. The club had participated in the Northern Counties East League, the FA Cup and the FA Vase.

Honours
Lincolnshire League
Supplementary Cup winners 2016/17
 Challenge Cup winners 2017/18
East Lincolnshire Combination
 Junior Challenge Cup winners 2018/19

Stadium
The club's home ground is Blossom Way Sports & Social Club Immingham.

References

 http://www.pitchero.com/clubs/imminghamtownfc/news/immingham-town-fc-secures-re-birth-1573281.html

Football clubs in Lincolnshire
Football clubs in England
Lincolnshire Football League
Northern Counties East Football League
Immingham